The Cuckoo class was a class of twelve 4-gun schooners of the Royal Navy, built by contract in English shipyards during the Napoleonic War. They followed the design of the Bermuda-designed and built Ballahoo-class schooners, and more particularly, that of Haddock. The Admiralty ordered all twelve vessels on 11 December 1805. A number of different builders in different yards built them, with all launching in 1806.

Operational lives
Nine of the twelve vessels were lost or disposed of during the war, the survivors being sold in 1816. Enemy forces took four, of which the British were able to retake two. Seven wrecked or foundered with a loss of about 22 crew members in all.

William James wrote scathingly of the Cuckoo and Ballahoo-class schooners, pointing out the high rate of loss, primarily to wrecking or foundering, but also to enemy action. He reports that they were "sent to 'take, burn, and destroy' the vessels of war and merchantmen of the enemy". The record suggests that none seem to have done so successfully. In the only two (arguably three) cases when they did engage enemy vessels, in each case the enemy force was much stronger and the Cuckoo-class vessels were overwhelmed.

James also remarks that:

Ships

Citations

References

 
  

 
Schooners of the Royal Navy
Ship classes of the Royal Navy
Schooner classes